The Dubai Stars is a walk of fame which will be located along the pavement of the Sheikh Mohammed bin Rashid Boulevard in Downtown Dubai. The Dubai Stars was opened in October 2019 featuring 400 stars and will have 10,000 stars when completed.

Stars
The following is a list of confirmed stars.

Ahlam (singer)
Khabib Nurmagomedov
Elie Saab
Mo Salah
Zhao Liying
Idris Elba
Haifa Wehbe
Will Smith
Zhang Ziyi
Chris Martin
Leonardo DiCaprio
Abdel Halim Hafez
Aamir Khan
Robert Downey Jr
Rami Malek
Usain Bolt
Serena Williams
Nile Rogers
Priyanka Chopra
Chris Hemsworth
Daft Punk
Chris Evans
Virat Kohli
Nancy Ajram
Zachary Levi
Ni Ni
Exo
Fayrouz
Ranveer Singh
Dwayne Johnson
Jackie Chan
Shah Rukh Khan
Lionel Messi
Shilpa Shetty
Gibran Kahlil Gibran
Abdul Majeed Abdullah
Mahendra Singh Dhoni
BTS
Sergio Ramos
Adnan Al Talyani
Mohammad Al-Shalhoub
Amitabh Bachchan
Stephen Chow
Amr Diab
Armin van Buuren
Hussain Al Jassmi
Sania Mirza
Hu Ge
Riyad Mahrez
Gulzar
Ranbir Kapoor
Valentina Shevchenko
Kylian Mbappé
Houriya Al Taheri
Maisoon Al Saleh
Hala Kazim
Sara Al Madani
Atif Aslam
Deepika Padukone
Casey Neistat
Sonam Kapoor

References

External links
Dubai Stars officially open to the public

Awards established in 2019
Tourist attractions in Dubai
Entertainment halls of fame
Walks of fame
2019 establishments in the United Arab Emirates